Yazıkarakuyu is a village in the Besni District, Adıyaman Province, Turkey. Its population is 669 (2021).

The hamlets of Kepirce and Yazıbademce are attached to the village.

References

Villages in Besni District